Katsu (Chinese: 喝; Pinyin: hè, Wade-Giles: ho; Cantonese: , rōmaji: katsu) is a shout that is described in Chan and Zen Buddhism encounter-stories, to expose the enlightened state (Japanese: satori) of the Zen-master, and/or to induce initial enlightenment experience in a student. The shout is also sometimes used in the East Asian martial arts for a variety of purposes; in this context, katsu is very similar to the shout kiai.

Etymology
The word in Chinese means literally "to yell" or "to shout". In Japanese it has also developed the meaning of "to browbeat", "to scold", and "hoarse".

In the context of Chan and Zen practice, the word is not generally used in its literal meaning(s), but rather—much as with the martial arts shout of kiai—as fundamentally a means of focusing energy.

Use
The katsu shout, insofar as it represents a kind of verbal harshness and even violence, can be considered a part of the Mahāyāna Buddhist doctrine of "skill-in-means", which essentially teaches that even an action or practice which seems to violate Buddhist moral guidelines—in this case, the Noble Eightfold Path's injunction against "abusive speech"—is permissible, and even desirable, so long as it is done with the aim of ultimately putting an end to suffering and introducing others to the dharma, or teachings of Buddhism.

The most celebrated and frequent practitioner of the katsu was the Chinese master Línjì Yìxuán (?–866), and many examples of his use of the shout can be found in the Línjì-lù (臨済錄; Japanese: Rinzai-roku), or Record of Linji, the collection of Linji's actions and lectures:

The use of the katsu stands in a tradition of antinomian methods, such as striking disciples with a stick or a fly whisk, which developed  within the Mǎzǔ Dàoyī (709–788) lineage. Linji greatly developed and used the katsu technique. In one of his lectures, often termed as "Linji's Four Shouts" he distinguished four different categories of katsu:

Death poems
The Rinzai school continued the practice of the katsu, as can be seen through the examples of the death poems of certain Rinzai priests:

References

Sources

 Dōgen. Dogen's Pure Standards for the Zen Community: A Translation of the Eihei Shingi. Tr. Taigen Daniel Leighton and Shohaku Okumura. Albany: State University of New York Press, 1996. .
 Dumoulin, Heinrich. Zen Buddhism: A History. Volume 1: India and China. Tr. Heisig, James W. and Knitter, Paul. Bloomington, Indiana: World Wisdom, 2005.
 —. Zen Enlightenment: Origins and Meaning. Weatherhill Publishers, 1979. .
 Hoffmann, Yoel; ed. and tr. Japanese Death Poems: Written by Zen Monks and Haiku Poets on the Verge of Death. Singapore: Charles E. Tuttle Company, Inc., 1986. .
 
 Payne, Richard K.; ed. Discourse and Ideology in Medieval Japanese Buddhism. New York: Routledge, 2006. .
 
Thanissaro Bhikkhu; tr. Magga-vibhanga Sutta: An Analysis of the Path, 1996. Retrieved 17 October 2006.
Watson, Burton; tr. The Zen Teachings of Master Lin-Chi: A Translation of the Lin-chi lu. New York: Columbia University Press, 1999. .

Zen art and culture